"Last Look at Eden" is the first single to be released from the Swedish heavy metal band Europe's eighth studio album, Last Look at Eden. It was released on 8 June 2009.

In May 2009 Europe went to Gothenburg to work with director Patric Ullaeus on the music video for "Last Look at Eden". The video was premiered on Europe's MySpace page on June 3.

Track listing

Single
"Last Look at Eden" (Joey Tempest, Andreas Carlsson, Europe) – 4:11
"U Devil U" (Joey Tempest, Europe) – 4:09
"Last Look at Eden" [radio edit] (Joey Tempest, Andreas Carlsson, Europe) – 3:59

Limited edition digipack
"Last Look at Eden" (Joey Tempest, Andreas Carlsson, Europe) – 4:11
"U Devil U" (Joey Tempest, Europe) – 4:09
"Superstitious" [live] (Joey Tempest) – 4:56
"Start from the Dark" [live] (Joey Tempest, John Norum) – 4:26
"Since I've Been Loving You" [live] (Jimmy Page, Robert Plant, John Paul Jones) – 7:24
"Last Look at Eden" [video]

Personnel 
Joey Tempest – vocals, producer
John Norum – guitars
John Levén – bass
Mic Michaeli – keyboards, producer
Ian Haugland – drums
Tobias Lindell – producer
Fredrik Etoall – cover photo
Dimitrios Dimitriadis – art direction

Chart positions

References 

2009 singles
Europe (band) songs
Songs written by Andreas Carlsson
Songs written by Joey Tempest
2009 songs
Music videos directed by Patric Ullaeus